The 2008 Massachusetts Republican presidential primary took place on February 5, 2008, with 40 national delegates. Polls indicated that former Governor of Massachusetts Mitt Romney was leading rival John McCain; Romney ended up defeating McCain by roughly 10% of the vote.

Results

* Candidate dropped out of the race before the primary

See also
 2008 Massachusetts Democratic presidential primary

References

Massachusetts
2008
Presidential
Massachusetts Republican primaries